Hugh Sinclair is an Australian professional rugby union player for the New South Wales Waratahs in Super Rugby. His position is flanker, and can also play number eight.

Career
He made his debut for the Rebels against the Sharks as a replacement for Jake Schatz in a 9-9 draw for the Rebels.
Moved to the Waratahs for the 2019 Super Rugby season

Super Rugby statistics

References

External links
 Hugh Sinclair - rugby.com.au

Australian rugby union players
Rugby union flankers
Melbourne Rebels players
Living people
1992 births
New South Wales Waratahs players
Rugby union number eights
Rugby union locks
Sydney (NRC team) players